Cologna Veneta is a comune (municipality) in the Province of Verona in the Italian region Veneto, located about  west of Venice and about  southeast of Verona.

The municipality of Cologna Veneta contains the frazioni (subdivisions, mainly villages and hamlets) Baldaria, Sabbion, Sant'Andrea, Spessa, and San Sebastiano.

Cologna Veneta borders the following municipalities: Asigliano Veneto, Lonigo, Orgiano, Poiana Maggiore, Pressana, Roveredo di Guà, Veronella, and Zimella.

Demographic evolution

References

External links
 www.comune.cologna-veneta.vr.it/

Cities and towns in Veneto